Ten Little Indians is a 2004 short story collection by Sherman Alexie. The collection contains nine stories all of which focus on the Spokane tribe of Native Americans in Washington state.

Stories
 The Search Engine
 Lawyer's League
 Can I Get a Witness?
 Do Not Go Gentle
 Flight Patterns
 The Life and Times of Estelle Walks Above
 Do You Know Where I Am?
 What You Pawn I Will Redeem
 Whatever Happened to Frank Snake Church

Reviews

References

Short story collections by Sherman Alexie
Novels set in Washington (state)
2003 short story collections
Grove Press books